Dor is a rural locality (a village) in Troitskoye Rural Settlement, Ust-Kubinsky District, Vologda Oblast, Russia. The population was 6 as of 2002.

Geography 
The distance to Ustye is 47 km, to Berezhnoye is 5 km. Shambovo is the nearest rural locality.

References 

Rural localities in Ust-Kubinsky District